Oncopeltus unifasciatellus is a species of seed bug in the family Lygaeidae, found in the Neotropics.

References

External links

 

Lygaeidae